The 2016–17 Boston University Terriers women's basketball team represented Boston University during the 2016–17 NCAA Division I women's basketball season. The Terries, led by third year head coach Katy Steding, played their home games at Case Gym and were members of the Patriot League. They finished the season 13–17, 11–7 in Patriot League play to finish in a tie for fourth place. They lost in the quarterfinals of the Patriot League women's tournament to American.

Roster

Schedule

|-
!colspan=9 style="background:#CC0000; color:#FFFFFF;"| Non-conference regular season

|-
!colspan=9 style="background:#CC0000; color:#FFFFFF;"| Patriot League regular season

|-
!colspan=9 style="background:#CC0000; color:#FFFFFF;"| Patriot League Women's Tournament

See also
2016–17 Boston University Terriers men's basketball team

References

Boston University
Boston University Terriers women's basketball seasons
Boston University Terriers women's basketball
Boston University Terriers women's basketball